Consort Chang (31 December 1808 – 10 May 1860), of the Manchu Hešeri clan belonging to the Bordered Blue Banner, was a consort of the Daoguang Emperor.

Life

Family background 
Consort Chang's personal name wasn't recorded in history. She was a member of a prominent Manchu Hešeri clan belonging to the Bordered Blue Banner.

Father: Ronghai, a third rank military official

 Paternal grandfather: Shanqing, a magistrate of Lizhou, Yingzhou, Huizhou
 Paternal grandmother: Lady Gioro

Mother: Lady Irgen Gioro
 Maternal grandfather: Qiming
Two younger brothers:

 First younger brother: Rushan (如山; b.1811), a jinshi of 1838 and third rank literary official in Sichuan
 Second younger brother: Longshan (隆山)

Two elder sisters
 First elder sister: Wife of Nianchang'a, an examiner (员外郎, pinyin: yuanwailang) of the Manchu Bordered Blue Banner
 Second elder sister: Wife of Linxiang, a second rank military official (pinyin:zongbin) and Grand Minister of Internal Affairs of the Mongol Plain White Banner.

Jiaqing era
Lady Hesheri was born in the 9th day of the 12th lunar month of the 12th year of Jiaqing era, which translates to 31 December 1808 in the Gregorian calendar.

Daoguang era
Lady Hesheri entered the Forbidden City between 1822 and 1825. Upon the entry, she was granted a title "Noble Lady Zhen" (珍贵人; "zhen" meaning "pearl", "precious"). She was demoted to "Concubine Zhen" (珍嫔) during her visit in Yuanmingyuan in 1826 because her Yanxi palace used a coach with four horses. Concubine Zhen didn't reflect herself well after her first demotion, so she was demoted to "Noble Lady Chang" in 1830 (常贵人, "chang" meaning "ordinary", "common"), and moved to Xianfu Palace on the western side of the Forbidden City. She remained childless during the Daoguang era. The Daoguang Emperor died on 26 February 1850.

Xianfeng era
After the enthronement of Xianfeng Emperor, Lady Hesheri was restored as "Concubine Chang" (常嫔). She lived in Shoukang palace in the western part of the Forbidden City. She died on 10 May 1860 in the Garden of Elegant Spring in Yuanmingyuan. She was posthumously granted a title "Consort Chang" (常妃) by the Tongzhi Emperor, the son of the   Xianfeng Emperor.

Titles
 During the reign of the Jiaqing Emperor (r. 1796–1820):
 Lady Hesheri (from 31 December 1808)
 During the reign of the Daoguang Emperor (r. 1820–1850):
 Noble Lady Zhen (from 1822), sixth rank consort 
 Concubine Zhen (from May 1825), fifth rank consort 
 Consort Zhen (from September 1825), fourth rank consort 
 Concubine Zhen (from 1826), fifth rank consort 
 Noble Lady Chang (from 1830), sixth rank consort 
  During the reign of the Xianfeng Emperor (r. 1850–1861):
 Concubine Chang (from unknown date), fifth rank consort 
 Consort Chang (from 1860)

See also
 Ranks of imperial consorts in China#Qing
 Royal and noble ranks of the Qing dynasty

References

Chinese imperial consorts
Consorts of the Daoguang Emperor